A Kamikaze (also known as a Double-Arm Ranger, The Apollo, or the Skymaster, scissors and Sky Flyer) is a pendulum amusement ride, usually found as a traveling ride, with some examples found at amusement parks. The ride is manufactured by FarFabbri & Sartori, and first made its debut in 1984. Since then, over 150 Kamikazes have been sold.

Design and operation

The ride consists of a single stationary tower, supporting two 16-passenger gondolas on rotating arms. Passengers are arranged in rows of two, with the first four rows facing in one direction, and the other four facing opposite. During the ride, passengers are swung backwards and forwards to build up momentum, before the gondola performs several inversions. The two gondolas are connected to the motor so that they swing simultaneously; with one arm rotating clockwise while the other rotates counterclockwise.

Passengers are restrained by a shoulder harness, as well as a secondary locking bar across their laps.  Compressed air is used to actuate the shoulder harness, with a fail-safe mechanism which engages the shoulder harness in the event of power failure.  The loss of compressed air also causes the shoulder harnesses to engage. In addition, the gondola's sides and roof are made up of closely spaced metal bars, allowing riders to see the world outside, while preventing anyone from falling out while the ride is in motion.  Like most ride safety measures, these are only effective if safety and height restrictions are enforced.  To date, the only deaths or severe injuries caused on a kamikaze ride have been caused by a failure to follow the height restrictions, or complacency on the part of the operator or deck personnel. Most carnivals, fairs, and amusement parks require riders to be at least 48 inches (122 cm) or taller.

The entire ride can be stowed on a single  trailer which requires a special permit to travel in the Continental United States, and can be assembled or disassembled in less than five hours, by two trained workers.

Older Kamikaze rides were powered by a  DC motor, coupled to a drive shaft which traveled up the tower to drive the rotating arms, but newer models are powered by the same DC motor mounted directly to a gearbox mounted at the top of the tower. This gearbox is manufactured by Brevini in Italy, with a coupling box made by PTG.  The same planetary gear used can be found on a large quantity of earth movers all over Europe.

Variants
Similar designs have been produced by A.R.M. (Skymaster), Topfun, Meisho, Mondial (Sky Flyer), and Vekoma (Sky Flyer). There is a version of the ride called the Footloose, where the riders feet are dangling below the car.  There is also a park model manufactured by Zamperla called the Hawk 48 where riders' feet dangle below the seats.

Appearances
 Australia – At least 5; Pharaoh's Curse at Luna Park Melbourne, five transportable Fabbri Kamikazes-Shockwave owned by Flaherty Family Amusements, Kamikaze x2 owned by Watkins and Lynch's, Ranger x2 Owned by O'Neill Shows and Show West, a Satori Kamikaze from New Zealand’s Larkin Amusements is now owned by Queensland Amusement Hire and an A.R.M Skymaster called the Hangover which is owned by Verfurths. Also a single-arm Kamikaze made by A.R.M called the Top Gun which is owned by East Coast Amusement's and Foster's Carnival Amusement's.
 The Bahamas – The Holiday Carnival hosts this ride.
 Brazil – Multiple transportable Kamikazes
 Canada – At least one transportable model, often featured at the Calgary Stampede.
 Colombia – Two machines operating at [River View Park and Great Adventure Park on this one is called RANGER]
 Costa Rica - One stationary operating at Parque Diversiones amusement park. 
 Chile – At least one stationary operating at Fantasilandia.
 England – Voltar at Pleasure Island Family Theme Park, Cleethorpes and Flamingo Land Resort, Malton.
 India – Kamikaze ranger at mgm dizee land in chennai
 Japan – At least one Vekoma model with the name PaniClock at Fuji-Q Highland
 Malaysia – Tomahawk at Sunway Lagoon, Asteroid Attack at MAPS Perak
 New Zealand – One Kamikaze owned by Larkin Amusements
 Poland – One stationary Kamikaze operating as Space Gun in Energylandia
 Scotland – At least two transportable models. One stationary operating at M&D's.
 South Korea – At least one Vekoma model, in Seoul Land with the name X Flyer, Apollo at Tongdo Fantasia, one Kamikaze at E-World with the name Ranger.
 United States – Aero 360 at Kennywood, Hammerhead Shark at Six Flags Discovery Kingdom, and Meteor at Dorney Park & Wildwater Kingdom (both a Zamperla Hawk 48). According to representatives at FarFabbri, Texas, there are over 50 of these rides currently operating in the United States.
 Serbia - one travelling model.

External links
 Amusement Ride Extravaganza - Kamikaze
 - Site Kamikaze
 

Pendulum rides
Upside-down amusement rides